Oliver W. "Onslow" Humphreys (born c. 1893) was a rugby union player who represented Australia.

Humphreys, a fly-half, was born in Sydney and claimed a total of 6 international rugby caps for Australia.

References

                   

Australian rugby union players
Australia international rugby union players
Rugby union players from Sydney
Rugby union fly-halves